Edward Cave (27 February 1691 – 10 January 1754) was an English printer, editor and publisher. He coined the term "magazine" for a periodical, founding The Gentleman's Magazine in 1731, and was the first publisher to successfully fashion a wide-ranging publication.

The son of a cobbler, Cave was born in Newton near Rugby, Warwickshire, and attended Rugby School, but was expelled after being accused of stealing from the headmaster Henry Holyoake. He worked at a variety of jobs, including timber merchant, reporter and printer. He conceived the idea of a periodical that would cover every topic the educated public was interested in, from commerce to poetry, and tried to convince several London printers and booksellers to take up the idea. When no one showed any interest, Cave took on the task himself. The Gentleman's Magazine was launched in 1731 and soon became the most influential and most imitated periodical of its time. It also made Cave wealthy.

Cave was an astute businessman. He devoted all his energy to the magazine, and rarely left its offices at St John's Gate, Clerkenwell. He made use of many contributors, most famously Samuel Johnson, who was always grateful to Cave for having provided his principal employment for many years. Cave himself often contributed pieces to the Magazine under the pen name of Sylvanus Urban.

He also obtained a licence from Lewis Paul for 250 spindles for his patent roller-spinning machine, a precursor of the water frame.  In 1742 he bought Marvel's Mill at Northampton and converted this to a cotton mill, probably the first water-powered spinning mill in the world.  This was apparently profitable, but only modestly so. It closed in 1761, or soon after.

Cave suffered from gout. He is buried at St. James Church, Clerkenwell.

References

External links

 Online page images of Gentlemen's Magazine Covering v. 1 (1731) to v. 20 (1750).
 Daily Life in Georgian England as Reported in the Gentleman's Magazine

1691 births
1754 deaths
British magazine publishers (people)
People from Rugby, Warwickshire
People educated at Rugby School
English editors
18th-century English businesspeople
18th-century British journalists